The Girl from Paris is a 2001 French film directed by Christian Carion.

Plot
Sandrine (Mathilde Seigner) gets tired of her life as an IT instructor in Paris and decides to leave her work and dedicate her life to agriculture. She first goes to college where she earns her BTS in two years, undertaking internships along the way. She then wishes to buy an isolated farm in the Vercors from an old farmer called Adrien (Michel Serrault) who wishes to retire.

Sandrine brings a new approach to the farming enterprise incorporating her internet knowledgeability: she converts an unused cow barn into a bed and breakfast, invites busloads of school children in for day tours, and sells her goat cheese over the Internet. Over time Sandrine and Adrien navigate their way from prickly separatism to mutual respect and warmth. The film ends with a shot of her leading her goats along the usual route, suggesting she has successfully addressed all those initial challenges.

Cast
 Michel Serrault as Adrien
 Mathilde Seigner as Sandrine
 Jean-Paul Roussillon as Jean
 Frédéric Pierrot as Gérard
 Marc Berman as Stéphane

Reception
A.O. Scott reacts positively, stating 'As Adrien reveals the tragedies and setbacks he has suffered in his struggle to remain on the land, a wider social background comes into view, and you, along with Sandrine, come to a profound and remarkably unsentimental appreciation of country life.'

References

External links 
 

French comedy films
2001 films
Films directed by Christian Carion
Films set in France
2000s French films